The women's 4 × 100 metre medley relay event at the 2018 Mediterranean Games was held on 25 June 2018 at the Campclar Aquatic Center.

Records 
Prior to this competition, the existing world and Mediterranean Games records were as follows:

The following records were established during the competition:

BK – Backstroke lead-off leg

Results 
The final was held at 19:24.

References 

Women's 4 x 100 metre medley relay
Medit